Arni-Kelapur Assembly constituency is one of the 288 constituencies of Maharashtra Vidhan Sabha and one of the seven which are located in Yavatmal district. It is reserved for Scheduled Tribe candidate.

It is a part of the Chandrapur (Lok Sabha constituency) with adjoining Chandrapur district along with five other Vidhan Sabha assembly constituencies, viz. Rajura, Chandrapur(SC), Ballarpur and Warora from the Chandrapur district and Wani from the Yavatmal district.

The remaining constituencies from Yavatmal district, Ralegaon(ST), Yavatmal, Digras and Pusad are part of Yavatmal-Washim (Lok Sabha constituency) while Umarkhed is part of the Hingoli (Lok Sabha constituency).

Members of Legislative assembly

References

Assembly constituencies of Maharashtra
Yavatmal district